The 1894 FA Cup final was contested by Notts County and Bolton Wanderers at Goodison Park. Notts County won 4–1, with goals by James Logan (3) and Arthur Watson. Jim Cassidy scored for Bolton. Notts County became the first team from outside the top flight to win the FA Cup.

Match details

References
Line-ups
Match report at www.fa-cupfinals.co.uk

1894
1893–94 in English football
Notts County F.C. matches
Bolton Wanderers F.C. matches
March 1894 sports events